The BAC Jet Provost is a British jet trainer aircraft that was in use with the Royal Air Force (RAF) from 1955 to 1993. It was originally developed by Hunting Percival from the earlier piston engine-powered Percival Provost basic trainer, and later produced by the British Aircraft Corporation (BAC). In addition to the multiple RAF orders, the Jet Provost, sometimes with light armament, was exported to  many air forces worldwide. The design was also further developed into a more heavily armed ground attack variant under the name BAC Strikemaster.

Development

Origins
In early 1951, Hunting Percival began work on the design studies that would ultimately lead to the Jet Provost. At the time, the company was in the process of establishing mass production for the earlier piston-engined Percival Provost basic trainer, but had anticipated that demand for a jet-powered trainer aircraft would be on the horizon. The design team aimed to produce an aircraft capable of equalling the handling characteristics of operational jet fighters of the era while also possessing modest approach and stall speeds and remaining simple to handle, as opposed to aiming to obtain maximum performance.

During the early design process, a series of increasingly frequent liaisons with RAF Flying Training Command took place, helping to gauge the considerations required to succeed in aspects of the proposed aircraft's design, such as instructional processes and maintenance requirements. During development, Hunting Percival had intentionally reused as many existing components and subsystems of the Percival Provost as possible, including the tail surfaces, main planes and main undercarriage legs, to speed development through to the prototype stage. The initial design work was performed as a private venture, independent of any service requirement; in March 1953, sponsorship from the British Government to support the development was made available as a result of interest from the Ministry of Supply. That same month, an order for service-test quantity of Jet Provosts was received.

Prototypes and evaluation
On 16 June 1954, the prototype XD674 conducted its maiden flight from the factory at Luton Airport, flown by Dick Wheldon. A series of seven flights were flown in quick succession over the following three days. By early November 1954, a total of 123 flying hours had been accumulated by the prototype during Hunting Percival's own flight test program, after which the prototype was submitted for official trials at RAF Boscombe Down. While testing proved the overall performance of the Jet Provost to be satisfactory, refinements were made, such as shortening the legs of the landing gear for a smoother ride when deployed at semi-prepared airstrips.

On 19 February 1955, the first of ten pre-production aircraft, designated as the Jet Provost T1, performed its first flight. In May 1955, three of the pre-production aircraft were assigned for the first stage of service trials with the Central Flying School (CFS) of the RAF to determine the value of the Jet Provost in the ab initio training role and to develop a syllabus for the training program. During the second stage of CFS trials using the same three aircraft, actual students were introduced to the type for practical evaluation purposes, which was performed at RAF Hullavington until the successful completion of trials on 2 July 1956. According to feedback from CFS examiners, the Jet Provost had noticeably improved the performance of students during its trial deployment.

Further development
As a result of the results and responses produced from the trials performed using the pre-production aircraft, Hunting Percival proceeded to develop and incorporate several different improvements upon the design. Amongst the changes made was an overall smoothening of the fuselage lines, hydraulic systems being substituted for pneumatic counterparts, and the addition of a dorsal fillet; the new model was designated as the Jet Provost T2. On 1 September 1955, the first Jet Provost T2 made its first flight. This variant was used only for development work; in addition to seeing use at Hullavington, three Jet Provost T2s were dispatched overseas for winterization trials in Scandinavia and a series of sales tours across Europe, Canada, the United States of America, and Latin America.

In June 1957, a production order was placed for the first 40 of the developed Jet Provost T3, featuring a more powerful Armstrong Siddeley Viper jet engine, ejector seats, a redesign of the airframe, and a shortened and strengthened version of the retractable tricycle undercarriage. Percival built a single example, which was used purely for structural tests throughout the development stages, giving the designers valuable research into what could be achieved with the basic design. On 22 June 1958, the first Jet Provost T.3 conducted its first flight. In total, 201 T3s were delivered between 1958 and 1962.

The T4 followed in 1960, fitted with a more powerful variant of the Viper engine and first flown on 15 July, and this was followed by the pressurised T5 in 1967. The T51 was an armed export version, sold to Ceylon (present day Sri Lanka), Kuwait and Sudan. It was armed with two 7.7-mm (0.303-inch) machine guns. The T52 was another export version sold to Iraq, South Yemen, Sudan and Venezuela, with the same armament as the T51. The T55 was the final armed export version which was sold to Sudan. A more heavily armed variant of the airframe was developed as the BAC Strikemaster.

Design

The BAC Jet Provost is a dedicated jet-powered trainer aircraft; according to aviation publication Flight International, it has the distinction of being the first ab initio jet trainer to be standardised by any air force. As designed, it was intended for the Jet Provost to replace, rather than accompany, the use of piston-engine trainer aircraft. The Jet Provost incorporates numerous features to support students during training. The aerodynamic design deliberately avoids speed, instead focusing on favourable handling characteristics and ease of recovery from stall and spin conditions. An emphasis was placed on flexibility, enabling use of the type throughout a range of training operations.

The cockpit of the Jet Provost, and much of the operational equipment fittings, is essentially identical to that of the preceding Percival Provost. It features a side-by-side seating arrangement, both positions being fitted with duplicated flight controls and instrumentation, which is well suited to the pupil-instructor pairing. The dual flight controls employs conventional manually-controlled flight control surfaces via a cable-and-tie rod arrangement. A key feature for the era amongst the fittings in the cockpit is the Centralized Warning Panel, which alerts the pilots in the event of a number of unfavourable or hazardous conditions being detected, such as icing conditions, fire, and oxygen failure. The high-flying capabilities of the Jet Provost necessitated the addition of an oxygen system in the cockpit, which was unpressurised on early production aircraft.

The Jet Provost has an uncomplicated structure, the airframe being based on the Percival Provost, albeit being strengthened in key areas such as the main wing spar and featuring a substantially different undercarriage arrangement. It possesses an all-metal stressed-skin fuselage built in two sections, the forward section stretching from the rear of the engine bay to the nose comprises a double-frame to absorb the wing and engine loads, while the rear fuselage section uses an orthodox semi-monocoque structure. Major loads across the fuselage are supported by a combination of four longerons and a single longitudinal beam across the upper-center line. The ailerons, elevators, and rudder are all attached to the airframe via two inset hinges each. The nose contains a hinged metal assembly, housing the radio, batteries, and other electronic equipment, and is easily serviceable by ground crew. All fuel tankage is housed within the wings. Where possible, all components used were designed to maximized interchangeability and to conform with international standardisation; a total of 49 service panels across the aircraft's exterior provides access for maintenance and servicing.

The Jet Provost is equipped with a single Armstrong Siddeley Viper 101 turbojet engine, which is mounted behind the cockpit in a roomy stainless steel-lined engine bay upon a secondary steel-tube structure. Air is fed to the engine by a pair of ram-air intakes set on either side of the aircraft's forward fuselage connected via sharply-curving ducts to converge just forward of the engine itself. As supplied, each engine is delivered as a compact engine-change unit, comprising the engine itself, accessories, and oil tank. Both the hydraulic and electrical systems were driven via a fuselage-mounted accessories gearbox connected to the Viper engine by a telescopic drive. One particularly favourable aspect of the Viper engine is the low maintenance demands imposed for the era. Engine ignition is achieved via an electric starter system, the engine controls have been described as being of a conventional nature.

Operational service 

The Jet Provost proved to be a capable trainer, being used in the ab initio Basic Trainer role from the outset (pilots progressed to the de Havilland Vampire and later the Folland Gnat for Advanced Jet Training).

After successful acceptance trials of the T1 during late 1955 at No. 2 Flying Training School at RAF Hullavington, the RAF formally accepted the type in 1957. The first production version was the T3, powered by the Viper 102, and this entered service with No. 2 FTS, located at RAF Syerston, during June 1959, when deliveries commenced from the Hunting Aircraft factory at Luton airport. The T3 was also operated by Central Flying School at RAF Little Rissington; the Royal Air Force College at RAF Cranwell,  Lincolnshire; by No. 1 Flying Training School at RAF Linton-on-Ouse, Yorkshire; 3FTS at RAF Leeming, Yorkshire; 6FTS at RAF Acklington, Northumberland; and 7FTS at RAF Church Fenton, Yorkshire. The twin-seated side by side variant was also used at RAF Brawdy in Wales to train Forward Air Controllers.

The later T4 was fitted with the more powerful Viper A.S.V. 11 of 2,500 lbs static thrust and first flew on 15 July 1960. It quickly entered service with the units listed above.

The T5 variant was fitted with the Viper 201 and cockpit pressurisation. These developments encouraged the RAF to utilise the Jet Provost in a number of different roles besides basic training. With a top speed of 440 mph, excellent maneuverability, mechanical reliability and low operating costs, the Jet Provost was utilized as an aerobatic aircraft, air warfare and tactical weapons training as well as advanced training. The first T5 made its maiden flight on 28 February 1967 and deliveries from BACs Warton factory commenced on 3 September 1969. Operators of the T5 included the RAFs Central Flying School and No. 1, No. 3 and No. 6 Flying Training Schools.

Besides service with the RAF, the Jet Provost found success in export markets. A single Jet Provost T2 was exported to Australia and was operated by the Royal Australian Air Force (RAAF) to evaluate the type for the purpose of providing 'all-through' jet-based training. Following a six-month evaluation period, the RAAF ultimately decided to retain the de Havilland Vampire to fulfill its requirements for a jet-powered trainer, and later replaced its Vampires with the Italian-built Aermacchi MB-326 during the late 1960s instead. The sole aircraft itself was retained, being presented to the Sydney Technical College for use as an instructional airframe, and was later preserved.

Ceylon ordered 12 Jet Provost T51, these went into operational service in early 1960, one crashed in February 1960 following a flame out. The Provost were meant for pilot conversions for jets and intended as a stepping stone to introduce jet fighters to the Royal Ceylon Air Force (RCyAF). However these plans were scrapped due to defense cuts following the attempted coup in 1962 and by the late 1960s the remaining Provosts were mothballed. With the outbreak of the 1971 JVP insurrection in April 1971, the RCyAF took out its mothballed Provosts and started a crash program to bring these to operational readiness in three days. These Provost carried out ground attack sorties on insurgent targets, vectored in by helicopters that used smoke bombs to mark targets for Provosts. One Provost crashed returning from a sortie and its pilot killed.

Nigeria acquired two ex-Sudan Air Force Jet Provost T.51s in 1967, using them for training and ground attack purposes against Biafra during the Nigerian Civil War. Flown both by Nigeran and mercenary pilots, they proved effective as in both roles, but efforts to obtain more Jet Provosts directly from Britain failed.
   
The Jet Provost was withdrawn from RAF service during the early 1990s, having been replaced by the newer turboprop-powered Short Tucano. Ab initio training had reverted to piston-engined aircraft in the early 1970s, using the Scottish Aviation Bulldog.

The Jet Provost remains popular among private operators and enthusiasts; being an inexpensive jet, many have been acquired and maintained in a flightworthy condition by collectors and private individuals. Some are flown at airshows, whilst roughly equal numbers are maintained in ground-runnable condition at various locations, many of these being in the United Kingdom.

Variants

Operators 

Royal Australian Air Force evaluated a single T.2 in No. 1 Flying Training School RAAF for six months in 1959.

Royal Ceylon Air Force received 12 T.51s.

Iraqi Air Force received 20 T.52s, with deliveries starting in August 1964.

Kuwait Air Force received six T.51s.

Nigerian Air Force received two ex-Sudanese T.51s in 1967. 

Portuguese Air Force received one T.2B in 1959.

Republic of Singapore Air Force operated three (ex-South Yemen Air Force) T.52s from 1975 until 1980.

People's Republic of Yemen Air Force received four T.52As in 1967, and four more in 1970.

Sudan Air Force received four T.51s and eight T.52s in 1962. Five T.55s were ordered in 1966.

Royal Air Force

Venezuelan Air Force received 15 T.52s.

Preserved aircraft

Australia
 The only Jet Provost T2 to enter service with the RAAF, A99-1, is preserved at the RAAF Museum, RAAF Williams, Point Cook, Victoria, Australia.
 A Jet Provost is outdoors in preservation at Gippsland Armed Forces Museum (West Sale Airport, VIC)

Canada
 Jet Provost T4, XR679 (C-FDJP), is housed at the Jet Aircraft Museum, London International Airport, Ontario, Canada.

Cyprus
 Jet Provost T4, XP666 is privately owned at Pafos Airport, Cyprus.

Germany
 Jet Provost T4, XS217 is privately owned in Germany.

Jersey
 Jet Provost T4, XP573 is at the Jersey Airport Fire Section, Channel Islands.

New Zealand
 Jet Provost T5A, XW357, is on display at the National Transport and Toy Museum, Wanaka, New Zealand.

Sri Lanka
 2 Jet Provost T51s are on display at the Sri Lanka Air Force Museum, Rathmalana, Sri Lanka.

United Kingdom
 Jet Provost T3, XN458 was bought on eBay for £1,050 by a group of people formed for the purpose, the 458 Club. It was put on display after restoration, in the original 1960s colour scheme of 1 FTS, in the beer garden of the Standard Inn, Northallerton, North Yorkshire, England, whose landlord Paul Greig found and snipe-bid for the aircraft.
 Jet Provost T3A, XM412, is located on the airfield at Balado, near Kinross, Scotland.
 Jet Provost T3A, XM414, is located at the Ulster Aviation Society at Long Kesh, Northern Ireland.
 Jet Provost T3A, XM479, is owned by a private group and flies from Teesside International Airport.

 Jet Provost T3A, XN586, is on display at the Brooklands Museum, Weybridge, Surrey, England.
 Jet Provost T4, XP556, is at Cranwell Aviation Heritage Museum, North Rauceby, Lincolnshire, England.
 Jet Provost T4, XP557, is at Dumfries and Galloway Aviation Museum, Dumfries, Scotland.
 Jet Provost T4, XP568 is on static display at East Midlands Aeropark.
 Jet Provost T4, XP627, is on display at North East Aircraft Museum, Sunderland, Tyne and Wear, England.
 Jet Provost T4, XP640, is preserved at the Yorkshire Air Museum, Elvington, York, England.
 Jet Provost T4, XS209, is located at the Solway Aviation Museum, Carlisle Lake District Airport, England.
 Jet Provost T5, XW323, is located at the Royal Air Force Museum London, Hendon Aerodrome, London, England.
 Jet Provost T5A, XW405, is on display at the Hartlepool College of Further Education, Hartlepool, England.
 Jet Provost T5A, XW434, is on display as gate guardian at Wolverhampton Halfpenny Green airport

United States
 Jet Provost T3A, XM357, is housed at the Tillamook Air Museum, Oregon.
 Jet Provost T3A, XM464, is on static display at Pima Air & Space Museum in Tucson, Arizona.

 Jet Provost T5A, XW294, located at the Everett Community College. Paine Field, Washington
 Jet Provost T5A, XW312, also located at the Everett Community College. Paine Field, Washington

Specifications (Jet Provost T.5)

See also

References

Citations

Bibliography

 Clarke, Bob. Jet Provost: The Little Plane With The Big History. Stroud, UK: Amberley Publishing Plc, 2008. .
 
 "Jet Provost T.3". Flight International, 13 June 1958. Vol. 73, No. 2577, pp. 795–799.
 "Jet Provost: Hunting Percival's New Ab Initio Trainer." Flight International, 6 May 1955. pp. 582–587.
 Taylor, John W.R. "Hunting Jet Provost and BAC 167." Combat Aircraft of the World from 1909 to the present. New York: G.P. Putnam's Sons, 1969. .
 Taylor, John W.R., ed. Jane's All The World's Aircraft 1971–72. London: Janes's Yearbooks, 1971. .
 Thetford, Owen. Aircraft of the Royal Air Force since 1918. Putnam & Company Limited. .

External links 

 The Jet Provost File: Individual RAF service histories 
 Jet Provost heaven
 Warbird Alley: Jet Provost page

Jet Provost
1950s British military trainer aircraft
Jet Provost
Single-engined jet aircraft
Low-wing aircraft
Aircraft first flown in 1954